Platylepas is a genus of barnacles in the family Platylepadidae of the subphylum Crustacea.

Species
Species within the genus Platylepas recognised by the World Register of Marine Species include:

Platylepas coriacea  Monroe & Limpus, 1979
Platylepas decorata  Darwin, 1854
Platylepas hexastylos  (Fabricius, 1798)
Platylepas indicus  Daniel, 1958
Platylepas krugeri  (Krüger, 1912)
Platylepas multidecorata  Daniel, 1962
Platylepas ophiophila  Lanchester, 1902
Platylepas wilsoni  Ross, 1963
 † Platylepas mediterranea Collareta et al., 2019

References

Barnacles